Kurdish-Islamic nationalism, also known as Kurdish-Islamic synthesis, is a form of Kurdish nationalism which is Islamist in nature, unlike mainstream Kurdish nationalism, which is largely secularist.

History
The ideology emerged after the abolition of the Caliphate and the creation of Turkey, two events which angered many Kurds, who felt that their culture, religion, language, and people were endangered because of Atatürk's reforms. 

Even more extreme Islamist Kurds, such as Mullah Krekar, often profess some degree of nationalism. In some videos, Mullah Krekar speaks about Kurdish issues and supporting Kurdish independence. He was described as "publishing political and nationalistic statements one day, and Jihadi statements on the next". 

Mullah Krekar is also a populist, and his popularity in Iraqi Kurdistan rose between 2017 and 2019, mainly among the youth who were against the Kurdish government. Mullah Krekar also added that secularism "has destroyed Kurdish values".

Kurdish Islamonationalism is often hostile to other nationalisms in the region, and ias also against Secularism, Kemalism, and Ba'athism. 

Ali Bapir is seen as the most prominent and influential contemporary Kurdish Islamist.

Criticism 
Many of Kurdistan Islamic Union's politicians, including their leader Salahaddin Bahaaddin, have criticized the ideology, saying that "This is a huge heresy", "Islam can not be nationalized", and that "There is only one Islam, the Islam of Allah." Many other people have also called the ideology "chauvinistic", "supremacist" "anti-Turkish", "Anti-Arabism", and "un-scientific". Secular Kurds often criticise this ideology and have had many instances of violence against Kurdish-Islamic synthesists.

Organizations

Sunni Muslim
Ansar al-Islam in Kurdistan
Kurdistan Brigades
Rawti Shax
Iran
Iranian Call and Reform Organization
Kurdish Hezbollah of Iran
Kurdish Revolutionary Hezbollah
Organization of Iranian Kurdistan Struggle
Iraq
Kurdistan Islamic Movement
Kurdistan Islamic Union
Kurdistan Justice Group
Kurdish mujahideen
White Flags
Syria
Kurdish Islamic Front
Movement of Salah al-Din the Kurd
Turkey
Free Cause Party
Islamic Party of Kurdistan
Kurdish Hezbollah
Kurdistan Islamic Movement (Turkey)

Shia Muslim
Islamic Fayli Grouping in Iraq

Kurdish-Islamic nationalists 

 Sheikh Said
 Osman Abdulaziz
 Ali Abdulaziz Halabji
 Ali Bapir
 Mullah Krekar
 Zekeriya Yapıcıoğlu
 Mehmet Yavuz
 Assi al-Qawali
 İshak Sağlam
 Khider Kosari
 Hüseyin Velioğlu
 Abu Abdullah al-Shafi'i
 Muhammad Salih Mustafa
 Ezaddin Husseini
 Sheikh Jalal Hosseini

See also
Kurdish Muslims 
Islamism
Kurdish nationalism
List of Kurdish organisations
Iranian Islamonationalism
Turkish Islamonationalism

Gallery

References

Islamic nationalism
Kurdish Islamism
Kurdish nationalism
Kurdistan independence movement
Opposition to Arab nationalism
Syncretic political movements